Susan Farrell Egan (born February 18, 1970) is an American actress, singer and dancer, known for her work on the Broadway stage. She is best known for originating the role of Belle in the Broadway musical adaptation of Beauty and the Beast (1994), as well as for providing the voices of Megara in Hercules (1997), Madame Gina in Porco Rosso (2005), Rose Quartz on Steven Universe, and Lin in Spirited Away.

Early life
Egan was born in Seal Beach, California on February 18, 1970. She attended Los Alamitos High School and the co-located Orange County High School of the Arts and UCLA. She is also a credited alumna of the Young Americans College.

Career

Stage and other work
Having long desired to become a performer, Egan spent most of her time taking dancing, concentrating on ballet, and singing lessons as a child, and trained as a competitive figure skater from ages five to ten.

While attending Los Alamitos High School, the Orange County High School of the Arts, and UCLA, she started her career touring with the performance group the Young Americans. While attending UCLA, Egan took time off when Tommy Tune cast her as Kim in his touring production of Bye Bye Birdie. After the tour ended, she was cast in the tour of State Fair and won the coveted role of Belle in the original Broadway cast of Beauty and the Beast, for which she was nominated for the Tony Award and the Drama Desk Award, Outstanding Actress in a Musical.

On Broadway, Egan portrayed Belle for one year and reprised the role in the Los Angeles production in 1995, along with many of the original Broadway cast members. At the Sacramento Music Circus, she portrayed Maria in The Sound of Music in 1996 and Molly Brown in The Unsinkable Molly Brown in 2002. Egan joined Thoroughly Modern Millie in February 2004 as Millie.

Egan has performed in one-woman, cabaret-style concerts at the Orange County Performing Arts Center in 2000 and at the Carpenter Performing Arts Center in October 2001. In August 2001, Egan appeared at the Hollywood Bowl in the concert version of Show Boat as Julie. She sings with symphonies, as well; she performed in concert at the Walt Disney Concert Hall with the Gay Men's Chorus of Los Angeles in November 2004.

From 2002 to 2003, she was the interim artistic director of the Orange County High School of the Arts.

On June 6, 2016, Egan appeared alongside Brad Kane at the Hollywood Bowl as opening acts for Disney's "The Little Mermaid Live" show. Egan performed a medley of songs from Beauty and the Beast. The June 6 performance also included the original Little Mermaid voice actress Jodi Benson performing with the rest of the "Live" cast. From July 20–29, 2018, Egan reprised the role of Belle in the 5-Star Theatre's production of Beauty and the Beast at the Thousand Oaks Civic Arts Plaza.

Television
On television, Egan is known for her co-starring role as Nikki Cox's best friend in Nikki.

Voice acting
Egan's voice has been featured in the English language versions of two feature films by Hayao Miyazaki, Spirited Away and Porco Rosso. She is most widely known for voicing Megara in the 1997 film Hercules and reprised her role in both Kingdom Hearts II and Kingdom Hearts III.

Egan provided Angel's singing voice in Lady and the Tramp II: Scamp's Adventure and the voice acting for Rose Quartz on the Cartoon Network animated series Steven Universe along with various other characters.

Personal life
Egan is married to Robert Hartmann and has two daughters, Nina (born February 6, 2007) and Isla (born December 15, 2009). She currently resides in Nashville, Tennessee.

Filmography

Broadway and stage
Source: Internet Broadway Database

 Bye Bye Birdie (1992, U.S. Tour as Kim MacAfee)
 State Fair (1992, tour; 1996, replacement Margie)
 Beauty and the Beast (1994, Belle)
 The Sound of Music (1996, Maria)
 Triumph of Love (1997, Princess Léonide)
 Cabaret (1998 revival) (various, 1999, 2000, 2003, Sally Bowles)
 Putting It Together (1999, The Mark Taper Forum, California) 
 The Unsinkable Molly Brown (2002, "Molly Brown", Sacramento Music Circus)
 Thoroughly Modern Millie (2004, replacement Millie Dillmount)

Discography
Source:
 2002: So Far...
 2004: Coffee House
 2005: All That & More
 2006: Winter Tracks
 2007: Susan Egan Live!
 2011: Secret of Happiness (includes Nina Doesn't Care video, Brian Haner music video, filmed in 2011)
 2015: Softly

References

External links
 
 
 
 More Than Just a Beauty—Show Music Magazine

1970 births
Living people
American women singers
American female dancers
American dancers
American women comedians
American voice actresses
American film actresses
American television actresses
American stage actresses
American video game actresses
American musical theatre actresses
People from Seal Beach, California
Actresses from California
UCLA Film School alumni
20th-century American actresses
21st-century American actresses
Orange County School of the Arts alumni
Comedians from California
20th-century American comedians
21st-century American comedians
The Young Americans members